Jung is a locality situated in Vara Municipality, Västra Götaland County, Sweden with 408 inhabitants in 2010.

References 

Populated places in Västra Götaland County
Populated places in Vara Municipality